The West Ewell and Ruxley Residents Association (WERRA) was formed in 1956 to give local people an independent voice about their area. It is one of 11 independent Residents Associations (RAs) that form the Residents Associations of Epsom and Ewell.

Composition and membership 

WERRA is a voluntary and unincorporated association, composed of members and a committee, with membership fees paid annually. The committee has a chair, vice-chair, secretary and a treasurer. There are also sub-groups for Revenue & Communications, Highways & Safety and Environment. Committee members are drawn from a variety of backgrounds with experience ranging from the armed forces, the police, the NHS and the civil service. Some are also small business owners or work in the corporate world. All committee members live in the local area, some having lived in the wards all their lives. The WERRA committee also features three former mayors of Epsom and Ewell.

Local elections 
The area spans two wards and is represented on the Epsom and Ewell Borough Council by six councillors Candidates from the WERRA committee contest all six available ward councillor seats and one divisional county councillor seat, standing for election under the Residents Associations of Epsom and Ewell. They currently have all six elected councillors on Epsom and Ewell Borough Council. These are divided equally with three councillors for West Ewell and three councillors for Ruxley. At county level the division is known as West Ewell, with one county councillor on Surrey County Council.

References

External links 
 

Epsom and Ewell